Tom Wahl's is a chain of fast-food restaurants based in the Rochester, New York area that currently has several restaurants around the Finger Lakes region.  USA Today named it one of "51 great burger joints across the USA" in 2010. 

The restaurant specializes in "ground steak sandwiches" and its famous root beer and sells Abbott's Frozen Custard.

History
Tom Wahl, Sr. opened the first restaurant in Avon, New York in March 1955.

Overview

The restaurant chain was sold in 1986 to Bill Gray's, Inc. During this time the chain opened a variant of its traditional diner-style restaurant called Wahl Street in the village of Pittsford. Featuring a more upscale feel to dining, this concept lasted a few years before closing down, returning the chain solely to the diner-style feel. In 2011, an equity group that includes Mark Wahlberg, Donnie Wahlberg, and chef Paul Wahlberg licensed the name "Wahlburger" from Tom Wahl's for use in their own restaurant.

There are now seven restaurants:        
Avon, New York
Bushnell's Basin, New York
Canandaigua, New York
Newark, New York
Fairport, New York
Brighton, New York
Greece, New York

The chain once had locations in the food courts at the Mall at Greece Ridge, the Marketplace Mall and Eastview Mall, but they are closed as of 2021.

See also
 List of frozen custard companies
 List of hamburger restaurants

References

External links

RocWiki article

Companies based in Monroe County, New York
Fast-food chains of the United States
Regional restaurant chains in the United States
Frozen custard
Root beer
1955 establishments in New York (state)
Restaurants established in 1955